St. Josaphat Ukrainian Catholic Church, Philadelphia, is located in Philadelphia at 4521 Longshore Ave. It serves the Ukrainian speaking population in the area.

History

The parish was founded in 1914 to serve those of the Ukrainian language in Northeast Philadelphia. Initially services were held in St. John Cantius Church in Bridesburg and in the homes of various parishioners. The first pastor was Rev. Volodymyr Petriwsky who served from 1915 to 1924. He was responsible for various innovations, such as having English taught, creating evening courses, and teaching the illiterate. In 1916 a Methodist house of prayer was purchased, along with its rectory, for the sum of $15,000.

Services
 Liturgy services are held at 5 p.m. in English on Saturday evenings and on Sundays at 10:00 a.m. in the Ukrainian language.
 Confessions are held on Saturday at 4:30 p.m. and on Sunday at 9:30 a.m.
 Baptisms, funerals, matrimony - by previous arrangements only.

Special events
Current and past events include:
Pasichnyk
 St Josaphat annual Praznyk
 St Josaphat Ukrainian Catholic Parish annual Christmas Bazaar
 Перша Свята Сповідь та Урочисте Святе Причастя в парафії свмч
 Parish Easter dinner (Sviachene)
 St Josaphat's Easter Food Blessing
 Celebration of the Sacrament of the First Penance and the Solemn Holy Communion

Contact information
Father Ihor Bloshchynskyy

4521 Longshore Ave.

Philadelphia PA 19135

Tel: 215-332-8488

Fax: 215-332-0315

School: 215-332-8008

References

1914 establishments in Pennsylvania
Churches in Philadelphia
Eastern Catholic churches in Pennsylvania
History of Catholicism in the United States
Northeast Philadelphia
Ukrainian-American culture in Pennsylvania
Ukrainian-American culture in Philadelphia